The 2019–20 season was SC Freiburg's 121st season in existence and the club's fourth consecutive season in the top flight of German football. In addition to the domestic league, SC Freiburg participated in this season's edition of the DFB-Pokal. The season covered the period from 1 July 2019 to 30 June 2020.

Players

Current squad

Out on loan

Transfers

Transfers in

Loans in

Transfers out

Loans out

Pre-season and friendlies

Competitions

Overview

Bundesliga

League table

Results summary

Results by round

Matches
The Bundesliga schedule was announced on 28 June 2019.

DFB-Pokal

Statistics

Appearances and goals

|-
!colspan="14" style="background:#dcdcdc;text-align:center"| Goalkeepers

|-
!colspan="14" style="background:#dcdcdc;text-align:center"| Defenders

|-
!colspan="14" style="background:#dcdcdc; text-align:center"|Midfielders

|-
!colspan="14" style=background:#dcdcdc;text-align:center"|Forwards

|-
! colspan=14 style=background:#dcdcdc; text-align:center| Players transferred out during the season

References

External links

SC Freiburg seasons
SC Freiburg